Glynde and Beddingham is an amalgam of two civil parishes in the Lewes district of East Sussex.

Glynde

Beddingham

Governance
On a local level, Glynde and Beddingham is governed by Glynde and Beddingham Parish Council. Council meetings are held every two months in the Beddingham Reading Room. Their responsibilities include footpaths, street lighting, playgrounds and minor planning applications. The Parish Council has seven seats; four representing Glynde Parish and two representing Beddingham Parish. All but one seat were filled in the 2015 election. The vacancy was filled later in 2015 by co-option.

The next level of government is the District Council. The parish of Glynde and Beddingham lies within the Ouse Valley and Ringmer ward of Lewes District Council which returns three seats to the council. The election in May 2015 elected two conservative, Paul Gander and Richard Turner, and one Liberal Democrat, Peter Gardiner.

East Sussex County Council is the next tier of government, for which Glynde and Beddingham is within the Ouse Valley East division, with responsibility for Education, Libraries, Social Services, Civil Registration, Trading Standards and Transport. Elections for the County Council are held every four years. In 2013, Peter Charlton (UKIP) was elected to represent the Division.

The UK Parliament constituency for Glynde and Beddingham is Lewes. Conservative, Maria Caulfield, was elected as Member of Parliament for Lewes in May 2015 replacing Liberal Democrat Norman Baker who had been MP since 1997.

For European Parliamentary elections, Glynde and Beddingham is in the South East England European Constituency which is represented by ten Members of the European Parliament (MEPs). The June 2014 election returned four United Kingdom Independence Party, three Conservative Party, one Liberal Democrat Party, One Green Party, and one Labour Party MEPs.

Landmarks
There are five Sites of Special Scientific Interest (SSSI) within the parish. Firle Escarpment, which extends into the neighbouring parish of Firle. Another site, completely within the parish is Asham Quarry which is of geological interest due to its stratigraphy of Devensian and Flandrian deposits.

Southerham Grey Pit and Southerham Machine Bottom Pit are two more SSSIs of geological interest within the parish. These sites are disused chalk pits which display a wide variety of fossilised fish remains. The final SSSI is Lewes Downs, a site of biological interest, which is an isolated area of the South Downs.

Within the parish, overlooking the village of Glynde, is Mount Caburn, a 480 foot (146 m) isolated peak on top of which sits an Iron Age hill fort.

Notes 

Local government in East Sussex
Lewes District